Κ-casein, or kappa casein, is a mammalian milk protein involved in several important physiological processes.  Chymosin (found in rennet) splits K-casein into an insoluble peptide (para kappa-casein) and  water-soluble glycomacropeptide (GMP). GMP is responsible for an increased efficiency of digestion, prevention of neonate hypersensitivity to ingested proteins, and inhibition of gastric pathogens. The human gene for κ-casein is CSN3.

Structure 

Caseins are a family of phosphoproteins (αS1, αS2, β, κ) that account for nearly 80% of bovine milk proteins and that form soluble aggregates are known as "casein micelles" in which κ-casein molecules stabilize the structure. There are several models that account for the spatial conformation of casein in the micelles. One of them proposes that the micellar nucleus is formed by several submicelles, the periphery consisting of microvellosities of κ-casein Another model suggests that the nucleus is formed by casein-interlinked fibrils. Finally, the most recent model proposes a double link among the caseins for gelling to take place. All 3 models consider micelles as colloidal particles formed by casein aggregates wrapped up in soluble κ-casein molecules.
Milk-clotting proteases act on the soluble portion, κ-casein, thus originating an unstable micellar state that
results in clot formation.

Milk clotting 
 
Chymosin (EC 3.4.23.4) is an aspartic protease that specifically hydrolyzes the peptide bond in Phe105-Met106 of κ- casein and is considered to be the most efficient protease for the cheesemaking industry. However, there are milk-clotting proteases able to cleave other peptide bonds in the κ-casein chain, such as the endothiapepsin produced by Endothia parasitica. There are also several milk-clotting proteases that, being able to cleave the Phe105-Met106 bond in the κ-casein molecule, also cleave other peptide bonds in other caseins, such as those produced by Cynara cardunculus or even bovine chymosin. This allows the manufacture of different cheeses with a variety of rheological and organoleptic properties.

The milk-clotting process consists of three main phases:

 Enzymatic degradation of κ-casein.
 Micellar flocculation.
 Gel formation.

Each step follows a different kinetic pattern, the limiting step in milk-clotting being the degradation rate of κ-casein. The kinetic pattern of the second step of the milk-clotting process is influenced by the cooperative nature of micellar flocculation, whereas the rheological properties of the gel formed depend on the type of action of the proteases, the type of milk, and the patterns of casein proteolysis. The overall process is influenced by several different factors, such as pH or temperature.

The conventional way of quantifying a given milk-clotting enzyme employs milk as the substrate and determines the time elapsed before the appearance of milk clots. However, milk clotting may take place without the participation of enzymes because of variations in physicochemical factors, such as low pH or high temperature. Consequently, this may lead to confusing and irreproducible results, particularly when the enzymes have low activity. At the same time, the classical method is not specific enough, in terms of setting the precise onset of milk gelation, such that the determination of the enzymatic units involved becomes difficult and unclear. Furthermore, although it has been reported that κ-casein hydrolysis follows typical Michaelis–Menten kinetics, it is difficult to determine with the classic milk-clotting assay.

To overcome this, several alternative methods have been proposed, such as the determination of halo diameter in agar-gelified milk, colorimetric measurement, or determination of the rate of degradation of casein previously labeled with either a radioactive tracer or a fluorochrome compound. All these methods use casein as the substrate to quantify proteolytic or milk-clotting activities.

FTC-Κ-casein assay

Κ-casein labeled with the fluorochrome fluorescein isothiocyanate (FITC) to yield the fluorescein thiocarbamoyl (FTC) derivative. This substrate is used to determinate the milk clotting activity of proteases.

FTC-κ-casein method affords accurate and precise determinations of κ-caseinolytic degradation, the first step in the milk-clotting process. This method is the result of a modification to the one described by S.S. Twining (1984). The main modification was substituting the substrate previously used (casein) by κ-casein labeled with the fluorochrome fluorescein isothiocyanate (FITC) to yield the fluorescein thiocarbamoyl (FTC) derivative. This variation allows quantification of the κ-casein molecules degraded in a more precise and specific way, detecting only those enzymes able to degrade such molecules. The method described by Twining (1984), however, was designed to detect the proteolytic activity of a considerably larger variety of enzymes. 
FTC-κ-casein allows the detection of different types of proteases at levels when no milk clotting is yet apparent, demonstrating its higher sensitivity over currently used assay procedures.
Therefore, the method may find application as an indicator during the purification or characterization of new
milk-clotting enzymes.

Notes

References

External links
InterPro: IPR000117 Kappa casein
Fluorescein Thiocarbamoyl-Kappa-Casein Assay for the Specific Testing of Milk-Clotting Proteases
Biotechnology and Microbiology 

Proteins
Laboratory techniques
Biochemistry